Megaera is one of the Erinyes, Eumenides or "Furies" in Greek mythology.  Bibliotheca Classica states "According to the most received opinions, they were three in number, Tisiphone, "Megaera ... daughter of Nyx and Acheron", and Alecto".

In other versions, she and her sisters, as well as the Meliae, were born of the blood of Uranus when Cronus castrated him.

In modern French, Portuguese, Modern Greek, Italian, Polish, Russian, Ukrainian and Czech, this name denotes a jealous or spiteful woman. She is not to be confused with Megara, the wife of Heracles.

Cultural depictions 
Minor planet 464 Megaira is named in her honour.

The 1964 Hammer horror film The Gorgon revolves around the re-emergence of Megaera in a Central European village circa 1910.

Magaera is one of the main characters in the Twilight Zone episode "Ye Gods", which depicts her as the true love of Cupid.

Megaera is a major character in the video game Hades. She is a boss and a potential romance partner to Zagreus, the main character.

Megaera is one of the three antagonists in the video game God of War: Ascension where she is portrayed as a deformed humanoid with spider like appendages.

See also 
 Family tree of the Greek gods
 Shrew (archetype)

References 

Greek goddesses
Furies/Erinyes
Underworld goddesses

Jealousy